The year 526 BC was a year of the pre-Julian Roman calendar. In the Roman Empire, it was known as year 229 Ab urbe condita.  The denomination 526 BC for this year has been used since the early medieval period, when the Anno Domini calendar era became the prevalent method in Europe for naming years.

Events 
Cylonius is overthrown by Kroton

Births 
 Wu Zixu, Chinese politician and general

Deaths 
 Amasis II, Egyptian pharaoh 
 Duke Zhao of Jin, ruler of the State of Jin 531 to 526 BC

References